St. Francis is an unincorporated community in Krain Township, Stearns County, Minnesota, United States.

The community is located along State Highway 238 (MN 238) near its junction with 440th Street.

References

Unincorporated communities in Stearns County, Minnesota
Unincorporated communities in Minnesota